The Anglican Church of St John The Baptist in Biddisham within the parish of Badgeworth, Somerset, England was built in the 13th century. It is a Grade II* listed building.

History

Following its original construction in the 13th century, on the site of an earlier two-cell church,  parts of the church were rebuilt in the `15th. It underwent extensive Victorian restoration around 1860.

The Crook Peak parish and benefice are within the Diocese of Bath and Wells.

Architecture

The stone church has a two-bay chancel and nave. The two-stage tower has a parapet.

The interior has a 12th century rectangular font. It has a scalloped bowl lined with lead.

The churchyard cross which dates from the late 14th century is also Grade II* listed. The original two-step base and part of the polygonal shaft are still present, however the head of the cross is missing.

References

Grade II* listed buildings in Sedgemoor
Grade II* listed churches in Somerset